Nicholas Cox may refer to:

Nicholas N. Cox (1837–1912), member of the United States House of Representatives
Nicholas Cox (British Army officer) (1724–1794), first Lieutenant-Governor of New Carlisle, Quebec